The 2021 Italian F4 Championship Powered by Abarth was the eighth season of the Italian F4 Championship.

Teams and drivers

Race calendar and results 

The calendar was revealed on 10 December 2020. Later on, the third round was postponed by one week.

Championship standings 
Points were awarded to the top 10 classified finishers in each race. No points were awarded for pole position or fastest lap. The final classifications for the individual standings were obtained by summing up the scores on the 16 best results obtained during the races held.

Drivers' championship

Secondary classes standings

Teams' championship 
Each team acquires the points earned by their two best drivers in each race.

Notes

References

External links 

 
 ACI Sport page

Italian F4 Championship seasons
Italian
F4 Championship